Ronald Henry Battams (16 April 1928 – 13 August 2004) was an Australian rules footballer who played with St Kilda in the Victorian Football League (VFL).

Battams who was in the Australian Navy managed to squeeze in 3 VFL games before the demands of duty restricted his chances.  He was recruited from the Flinders Naval Depot. In 1954 and 1955 he was playing for the Sydney Naval team in the NSWFL. He had won the team's best and fairest in 1954.

Notes

External links 

1928 births
Australian rules footballers from South Australia
St Kilda Football Club players
2004 deaths
Royal Australian Navy personnel